Sykkuno (born June 4, 1991) is an American live streamer. He is best known for his live streams, which were hosted on Twitch from 2019 to April 2022, before he began streaming exclusively on YouTube in May 2022.

Early Life
Sykkuno is a native of Southern California. He is of Chinese and Vietnamese descent. He has two sisters.

Career

Twitch
While his Twitch account has been active since November 14, 2011, Sykkuno began streaming on a regular basis in April 2019 after being convinced to do so by fellow streamer and OfflineTV member LilyPichu. He quickly gained popularity on the platform, with many attributing his calm, wholesome, laid-back demeanor as a factor.

In April 2021, Sykkuno participated in an hour-long charity Among Us stream on The Tonight Show with Jimmy Fallon, members of The Roots, fellow streamers Valkyrae and Corpse Husband, and Stranger Things actors Gaten Matarazzo and Noah Schnapp, with proceeds going towards Feeding America. Later in September 2021, Sykkuno hosted an impromptu subathon stream on his Twitch channel. His final Twitch stream took place on April 30, 2022.

YouTube
Sykkuno began creating video content for the online game League of Legends back in 2011 on YouTube. He started his YouTube career by posting commentary videos and gameplay on an older channel named "Sykku" before creating a newer channel later in 2012 named "Sykkuno". The newer YouTube channel would later on become the main channel in which he would continue posting videos that today consist of clips and compilations of his Twitch streams. Sykkuno continued to post videos and content primarily related to League of Legends until shifting to make content on other online games, such as Among Us and Grand Theft Auto V, with fellow content creators of the gaming community. While Sykkuno posted commentary game videos, he did not show his face until he started streaming with a webcam on Twitch in February 2020.

In May 2022, Sykkuno announced that he would be leaving Twitch for an exclusive streaming contract on YouTube. He signed with United Talent Agency for representation in August 2022.

Personal life
Sykkuno lives in Las Vegas.

Filmography

Anime

Music videos

Awards and nominations

See also
List of most-followed Twitch channels

References

External links

Living people
American people of Chinese descent
American people of Vietnamese descent
Twitch (service) streamers
Gaming YouTubers
People from San Gabriel, California
American YouTubers
YouTube streamers
1991 births